Drenje may refer to:
Drenje, Osijek-Baranja County, a municipality in Croatia
Drenje, Istria County, a hamlet in Croatia
Drenje, Dolenjske Toplice, a small settlement in Slovenia

See also
Drenje Brdovečko, a small settlement in Zagreb County, Croatia
Drenje Šćitarjevsko, a village in Zagreb County, Croatia